The Luck of the Irish is a 1920 American silent drama film directed by Allan Dwan. It is based on the 1917 novel The Luck of the Irish by Harold MacGrath. The film stars James Kirkwood Sr., Anna Q. Nilsson, Harry Northrup, Ward Crane, Ernest Butterworth Jr., and Gertrude Messinger. The film was released on January 5, 1920, by Realart Pictures Corporation.

Cast         
James Kirkwood Sr. as William Grogan
Anna Q. Nilsson as Ruth Warren
Harry Northrup as Richard Camden
Ward Crane as Norton Colburton
Ernest Butterworth Jr. as The Kid
Gertrude Messinger as The Kid's Romance 
Rose Dione as The Malay Street Woman 
Louise Lester as The Landlady
Buddy Messinger  (uncredited)
Claire Windsor as Extra (uncredited)

References

External links

1920 films
1920s English-language films
Silent American drama films
1920 drama films
Films directed by Allan Dwan
American silent feature films
American black-and-white films
Films based on American novels
1920s American films